Kadir Rana is an Indian politician, belonging to Samajwadi Party. In the 2009 election he was elected to the Lok Sabha from the Muzaffarnagar Lok Sabha constituency as a member of the 
Bahujan Samaj Party.

Kadir Rana was elected to Uttar Pradesh Legislative Council (MLC) in 1998 and later he become MLA from Morna constituency in year 2007.

References

External links
Official biographical sketch in Parliament of India website

India MPs 2009–2014
Lok Sabha members from Uttar Pradesh
Bahujan Samaj Party candidates in the 2014 Indian general election
People from Muzaffarnagar district
1961 births
Living people
Bahujan Samaj Party politicians from Uttar Pradesh
2013 Muzaffarnagar violence
Rashtriya Lok Dal politicians
Samajwadi Party politicians from Uttar Pradesh